Waryfishes are deep-sea aulopiform fishes in the small family Notosudidae. They are thought to have a circumglobal distribution in subarctic to subantarctic waters. The family name Notosudidae derives from the Greek noton (back) and Latin sudis (a fish, esox, the name of salmon).

Description 
Waryfishes are slender, scaled fish, similar in appearance to lancetfishes, but lacking the greatly enlarged dorsal fin. Although the adults are deep-water fish, the larvae inhabit surface waters, and are unique in having teeth on their upper jaws. Waryfishes lack a swim bladder.

 Dorsal fin: 9-14 rays
 Anal fin: 16-21 rays
 Pectoral fin: 10-15 rays
 Scales in lateral line: 44-65

References 

 

 
Aulopiformes
Ray-finned fish families